Erick Rodríguez Ayara (born 8 December 1968) is a retired Costa Rican professional footballer who plays as a midfielder. He is the father of Ariel Rodríguez, also a professional footballer.

References

1968 births
Living people
Association football midfielders
Costa Rican footballers
Costa Rica international footballers
1993 CONCACAF Gold Cup players
C.S. Cartaginés players